Martyn Paul Naylor (born 2 August 1977) is an English former footballer. He was a wing back who is currently assistant manager for National League North side Leamington in England.

Career

Naylor began his career with Hereford United, but left to join Telford United on a free transfer in August 1996 without making a first team appearance. In August 1997, he joined Shrewsbury Town, making his league debut on 9 August 1997 in the 2–1 win at home to Doncaster Rovers. Later that month, he also played in the League Cup defeat at home to Brentford and kept his place for the following league game away to Cambridge United. Town lost 4–3 and Naylor was sent off. He did not play for Shrewsbury again.

In September 1998, he rejoined Telford United on loan, moving on a free transfer the following January. He remained with Telford until July 2000, when he joined Scottish side Greenock Morton. He played nine times for Morton before returning to England in 2001 with Bilston Town.

In 2002, Naylor joined The New Saints (then named Total Network Solutions) and was a regular member of their title-winning sides. He was released from his contract at the end of the 2005–06 season, but was retained as a non-contract player with the Saints after an unsuccessful trial with Kidderminster Harriers. He went on to make 15 Welsh Premier League appearances in the 2006–07 season and remained with the Saints for the 2007–08 season.

He returned to Telford in 2008.

His brother Lee is also a professional footballer.

When Telford beat Kettering 1–0 in the FA Trophy on 31 January 2009, Martyn fractured his cheek bone in a collision with teammate Lee Vaughan.

In September 2011 it was announced he was registered with Worcester City but was playing for nothing as the club had spent its budget on players. He left the club in January 2012.

He joined Leamington on an initially short-term deal in October 2012. However, he was still at this club at the end of the 2020/21 as a coach.

References

External links

Welsh Premier Career Details

1977 births
Living people
Sportspeople from Walsall
English footballers
Hereford United F.C. players
Telford United F.C. players
Shrewsbury Town F.C. players
Greenock Morton F.C. players
The New Saints F.C. players
Cymru Premier players
English Football League players
Rhyl F.C. players
Scottish Football League players
National League (English football) players
Worcester City F.C. players
AFC Telford United players
Rushall Olympic F.C. players
Leamington F.C. players
Bilston Town F.C. players
Association football defenders